is a Japanese pop singer, and the oldest member of the group Coco. She was born in Tōkamachi, Niigata, but grew up in Tokyo. Miyamae was a member of Coco from September 1989 until the group's dissolution in 1994. She worked as a solo singer for a while but she left the entertainment industry in 2004 to attend Le Cordon Bleu. She is now a professional chef and food education instructor, running her own restaurant, "CAFE RESTAURANT M.NATURE", in Aoyama, Tokyo.

Discography

Singles 
 16 December 1992: 	Yume e no Position (Chun-Li's Theme)

Photobooks 
 1 October 1993: Bagus!
 10 February 1995: BREAK
 15 December 1995: Candied

Anime 
 DNAVI in Beast Wars Neo

See also 
 Coco

References

External links 
 Official site (archived)
 Profile on ameba.jp

1973 births
Living people
Singers from Tokyo
21st-century Japanese businesswomen
21st-century Japanese businesspeople
Women chefs
21st-century Japanese women singers
21st-century Japanese singers